Protopine is an alkaloid occurring in opium poppy, Corydalis tubers and other plants of the family papaveraceae, like Fumaria officinalis. Protopine is metabolically derived from the benzylisoquinoline alkaloid (S)-Reticuline through a progressive series of five enzymatic transformations: 1) berberine bridge enzyme to (S)-Scoulerine; 2) (S)-cheilanthifoline synthase/CYP719A25 to (S)-Cheilanthifoline; 3)  (S)-stylopine synthase/CYP719A20 to (S)-Stylopine; 4) (S)-tetrahydroprotoberberine N-methyltransferase to (S)-cis-N-Methylstylopine; and ultimately, 5) N-methylstylopine hydroxylase to protopine. 

It has been found to inhibit histamine H1 receptors and platelet aggregation, and acts as an analgesic.

See also 
 Protopine 6-monooxygenase
 Cryptopine
 Bürgi-Dunitz angle

References 

Natural opium alkaloids
Alkaloids found in Papaveraceae
Benzodioxoles